Epeli Saukuru (born 4 August 1988) is a Fijian professional football player who currently plays as a midfielder for Rewa, the Fiji national football team and the Fiji national beach soccer team.

Club career
Saukuru started his career with Ba, but he played almost his whole career with Rewa. In January 2018 he moved to Lautoka to play with them in the 2018 OFC Champions League. and later than year, He Moved back to Rewa.

National Team
Saukuru made his debut for the Fiji national football team on March 25, 2017. In a 2-0 defeat against New Zealand he played the whole match. Since then Saukuru has played 5 more games in which he scored two goals: In a 1-1 draw against the Solomon Islands and in a 2-1 loss against New Caledonia.

Personal life
Saukuru has a younger brother, Iosefo Verevou, who is also a football player.

References

1988 births
Living people
Fijian footballers
Fiji international footballers
Fijian beach soccer players
Ba F.C. players
Rewa F.C. players
Lautoka F.C. players
Association football midfielders